Wes Smith (born 17 August 1945) is a former  Australian rules footballer who played with Hawthorn in the Victorian Football League (VFL).

Notes

External links 

Living people
1945 births
Australian rules footballers from Victoria (Australia)
Hawthorn Football Club players
Nathalia Football Club players